The Connecticut Commuter Rail Council is an independent state board that acts as an advocate for commuters on the Metro-North, Hartford Line, and Shore Line East railroads in the state of Connecticut.

The Council holds regular, public meetings once a month (except in the summer) with Metro-North and Connecticut Department of Transportation (ConnDOT) officials to discuss concerns of commuters. The Council also solicits complaints from riders, issues annual reports on rail service and lobbies on behalf of commuters before state boards, offices, the governor and the Connecticut Legislature.

Activities
Board meetings are held in communities with commuter railroad stations, including Stamford, Norwalk, Bridgeport, New Haven, Hartford, New London, and occasionally Darien and Westport. One meeting a year is held at Grand Central Terminal in New York City, and one meeting is held at a town served by the Waterbury Branch.

The Connecticut group is distinct from the Metro-North Rail Commuter Council in New York state. By law it must send its annual reports to that body as well as the Management Advisory Board of the Office of the Inspector General of the Metropolitan Transportation Authority in New York.

The powers and duties of the Council are advisory and non-binding in nature as evidenced in the enabling statute:

Sec. 13b-212c. Powers and duties. The Metro-North New Haven Rail Commuter Council shall study and investigate all aspects of the daily operation of the New Haven commuter railroad line, monitor its performance and recommend changes to improve the efficiency and the quality of service of the operation of such line. The council may request and shall receive from any department, division, board, bureau, commission, agency, public authority of the state or any political subdivision thereof such assistance and data as it requests and will enable it to properly carry out its activities for the purposes set forth herein. The council shall report its findings and recommendations annually on or before January fifteenth, to the Governor, the Commissioner of Transportation, the Connecticut Public Transportation Commission, the General Assembly, the Metro North Rail Commuter Council located in New York and the management advisory board of the office of the inspector general of the Metropolitan Transportation Authority located in New York.

Membership
From the Connecticut law establishing the commuter council (Sec. 13b-212b. Metro North New Haven Rail Commuter Council established):

(a) There is established a Connecticut Commuter Rail Council which shall consist of fifteen members, all of whom shall be (1) commuters who regularly use the transportation services of the New Haven commuter railroad line which includes the New Canaan, Danbury and Waterbury branches of such line, (2) commuters who regularly use the transportation services of the Shoreline East railroad line, or (3) residents of a municipality in which the Commissioner of Transportation has proposed a new rail line or which has commenced operation after July 1, 2013. Members shall be appointed as follows: (A) The Governor shall appoint four members, one of whom shall be the chief elected official of a municipality located on an operating or proposed new rail line; (B) the president pro tempore of the Senate shall appoint three members;  (C) the speaker of the House of Representatives shall appoint three members;  (D) the minority leader of the Senate shall appoint one member;  (E) the minority leader of the House of Representatives shall appoint one member;  (F) the chairpersons of the joint standing committee of the General Assembly having cognizance of matters relating to transportation shall each appoint one member, one of whom shall be from a municipality in which the Commissioner of Transportation has proposed a new rail line or which has commenced operation after July 1, 2013, and one of whom shall be from a municipality in which a station for the Shoreline East railroad line is located; and (G) the ranking members of said committee shall jointly appoint one member who shall be from a municipality served by the Danbury or Waterbury branches of the New Haven commuter railroad line. Each member shall serve for a term of four years commencing on August 1, 2013. All initial appointments to the council shall be made by August 1, 2013. Any vacancy shall be filled by the original appointing authority by appointment for the unexpired portion of any term. Members of the council shall serve until their respective successors are appointed and approved by the General Assembly.

Current members
The following members were appointed to the Council for the year 2022
Jim Gildea – Chair
Jeffrey Maron - Vice Chair
Blaize Levitan – Secretary 
Jessica Bremner
Marcellus Edwards
Ashlee Fox
Mitch Fuchs
Douglas Hausladen
Melissa Kane
Julia McGrath 
Sue Prosi
Zell Steever
Kate Rozen

(Vacant)

See also
Metro-North Railroad
Shore Line East
New Haven Line
Hartford Line

References

External links

 
Rail Commuter Council, Connecticut
Transportation in Fairfield County, Connecticut
Transportation in New Haven County, Connecticut
Rail advocacy organizations in the United States